Algernon Charles Holland  (10 February 1919 – 2001) was a British businessman, and the founder of Amplifon.

Early life
Holland was born on 10 February 1919
in Horsham, Sussex. His father, Algernon Holland, a Captain in the Royal Air Force, died in the First World War, on 21 September 1918, before he was born. His father 
was serving with 249 Squadron, Seaplane Station, Dundee, when their Curtiss-H16 "Large America" flying boat "struck a ship's mast on the river Tay, crashed and burst into flames". He is buried at the Dundee Eastern Necropolis. He was the son of Arthur and Amy Holland of Horsham, Sussex.

His mother, Helen Ruth Menzies, was Scottish, born in Argentina, of Quinta Rannock, San Ferriemdo, Buenos Aires, Argentina, and in 1921, they moved to Buenos Aires, and he was educated there at the English College.

Second World War
In the Second World War, Holland served with Special Operations Executive. He was a Major in the Royal Corps of Signals, and was awarded an MBE, and a Military Cross in 1945. The MBE was awarded in 1943 for his services in Greece. In 1948, the US awarded him the Bronze Star Medal.

Career
Holland founded Amplifon in Milan, Italy in 1950, in part because of his experience with servicemen suffering hearing loss in the war, and because of the invention of the transistor in the late 1940s.

In 1971, he founded the independent not-for-profit Centre for Research and Studies (CRS) in Milan, to co-ordinate research into audiology and related areas.

Personal life
In 1950, Holland married Anna Maria Formiggini, who has been a director of Amplifon since 1980, chair since 1990, and honorary chair since 2011.

Their daughter Susan Carol Holland has been chair of Amplifon since 2011. She owns 44.9% of Amplifon through her family's holding company.

He died in 2001.

Legacy
The Amplifon Awards for Brave Britons was established in his honour, with Falklands war veteran Simon Weston as head of the judging panel.

References

1919 births
British Army personnel of World War II
Special Operations Executive personnel
2001 deaths
British company founders
Members of the Order of the British Empire
Recipients of the Military Cross
20th-century British businesspeople